The Price of a Party is a 1924 American silent melodrama film produced by Howard Estabrook and distributed by Associated Exhibitors. The film is based on a short story of the same name by William Briggs MacHarg published in Cosmopolitan magazine, with the film's scenario written by Charles F. Roebuck. It was directed by Charles Giblyn and stars Hope Hampton and Harrison Ford. The film was shot in Tec Art Studios.

In 2014, it was reported that an incomplete copy of the film was found in Navarre, Spain.

Cast
Hope Hampton as Grace Barrows
Harrison Ford as Robert Casson
Arthur Edmund Carewe as Kenneth Bellwood
Mary Astor as Alice Barrows
Dagmar Godowsky as Evelyn Dolores
Fred Hadley as Stephen Durrell
Edna Richmond as Evelyn's Maid
Donald Lashey as Hall Boy
Florence Richardson as Jazz Queen
Daniel Pennell
J. Moy Bennett

Preservation
A print of The Price of a Party has now been located and is now not considered a lost film.

References

External links

1924 films
1924 drama films
Silent American drama films
American silent feature films
American black-and-white films
Films based on short fiction
Films directed by Charles Giblyn
American independent films
Lost American films
Melodrama films
Associated Exhibitors films
1920s independent films
1924 lost films
Lost drama films
1920s American films
1920s English-language films
English-language drama films